Events from the year 1592 in India.

Events
 The Qutb Shahi monument Char Kaman is built in Hyderabad and Dutch came to India

Births
 January 5 – Shah Jahan, poet (died 1666).

Deaths

See also

 Timeline of Indian history

References